Danby Wiske railway station was a station on the East Coast Main Line. Opened on 1 December 1884 the station was closed to passengers on 15 September 1958.

Near to the station were water troughs to allow fast steam locomotives to take on water whilst still running.

In October 1937, a railway inspector received fatal injuries at the Danby Wiske water troughs; he was on the footplate of an A4 Pacific (4492, "Dominion of New Zealand") heading south when it encountered another locomotive hauled express going north. The northbound train had lowered their scoop to its limit, which when the water filled the tender, was unable to be retracted because of the force holding it there. The overflowing water hit the southbound express causing widespread damage, but critically, it forced out the glass from the locomotive's windows. The glass hit the railway inspector at the base of the neck and left him unconscious. He was taken off the train at Northallerton but later died in hospital.

References

Disused railway stations in North Yorkshire
Former North Eastern Railway (UK) stations
Railway stations in Great Britain opened in 1884
Railway stations in Great Britain closed in 1958